Al Hawkes (December 25, 1930 – December 28, 2018) was an American musician, founder of Event Records, and pioneer of the American bluegrass movement. He received state and national accolades, including being recognized as a member of the first generation of bluegrass musicians by the Bluegrass Music Hall of Fame and Museum in Kentucky.

Biography 
Hawkes was born in Providence, Rhode Island but moved back to his family's homestead in Westbrook, Maine when he was 10, in 1941.

His father helped him get hooked on southern hillbilly music by installing a radio with a long antenna that could pick up music from stations like WWVA, WCKY, WJJD, and, WBT.

When he was thirteen, Hawkes's mother bought him a guitar and chord book, and his father soon gave him a Gibson A4 mandolin. Hawkes formed his first band (Al Hawkes Hillbillies) as a high school sophomore. They played at local school functions and grange halls.

In the late 1940s Hawkes built a pirate radio station broadcasting at 1210KC on the AM dial, which he shut down in 1949 after the FCC learned of his illegal operation. He was soon was broadcasting five days a week from WLAM radio in Lewiston, Maine.

In the 1940s Hawkes performed as one half of the duo Allerton & Alton, the first interracial duo to play bluegrass. They performed live and on radio shows until 1951, despite the heavily segregated climate of the time.

In 1951, during the Korean War, Hawkes entered the Maine National Guard and was stationed in North Africa, where he was a disc jockey for Armed Forces Radio and performed for the troops. Here he had the opportunity to learn how to use up-to-date recording equipment. When he returned from North Africa, he went to Boston to the Massachusetts Radio and Broadcast School for two years, obtained his First Class Broadcast License, and graduated as an honor student.

In 1956 Hawkes formed Event Records, an independent label out of Westbrook, Maine with Richard Greeley. Together they recorded many high-profile artists including Dick Curless, Hal Lone Pine, Charlie Bailey, Lenny Breau, and Curtis Johnson. Event Records operated until 1962 when the warehouse of its Boston distributor was destroyed by a fire and thousands of records were lost, putting the company out of business.

In 2010 Andrew Jawitz made a 47-minute documentary, The Eventful Life of Al Hawkes, which was broadcast on the Maine Public Broadcasting Network and shown locally.

In 2013 Todd Hutchisen of Acadia Recording Company (a small recording studio in Portland, Maine) purchased all of the original recording equipment from Event Records and relocated and repaired the 1/4” mono tape decks, Altec stereo mixing board, Ampex 350s, real tape delay, spring reverb, and original RCA, Shure and EV microphones for use at Acadia. That equipment has been used to record several split 45 vinyl records with groups looking to recreate the iconic rockabilly sound.

After Event Records, Hawkes opened a TV repair shop at the same site as his recording studio. Its sign is now eligible for the National Register of Historic Places.

After his 80th birthday, then-Senator Olympia Snowe delivered a tribute to him in the Congressional Record, calling Hawkes "a Maine and national treasure."

Hawkes died on December 28, 2018, at the age of 88.

Awards 

 1980- Maine Country Music Hall of Fame
 1983- Bluegrass Artist of the Year MCMA
 1984- Folk Artist of the Year MCMA
 1990- North New Vineyard Mountain Bluegrass Festival- 1st place mandolin
 1991- The Lenny Breau Memorial Award
 1995- Dick Curless Memorial Award
 1996- 16th Annual Country Music Pioneer Award (DECMA)
 2001- Bluegrass Music Association of Maine’s Pioneer Award
 CMAA Instrumentalist of the Year
 2007- America’s Old-Time Country Music Hall of Fame
 2008- Lifetime Achievement Award (DECMA)
 2008- Music Industry Heritage Award (Boston Bluegrass Union)

Discography

Event Records catalogue

References 

1930 births
2018 deaths
Bluegrass guitarists
People from Westbrook, Maine
American country guitarists
Musicians from Maine
Musicians from Providence, Rhode Island
20th-century American guitarists